Mustad is a surname. Notable people with the surname include:

Halfdan Magnus Mustad (1874–1967), Norwegian businessman
Hans Mustad (1837–1918), Norwegian businessman
Hans Clarin Hovind Mustad (1871–1948), Norwegian businessman
Kristian Mauritz Mustad (1848–1913), Norwegian politician
Nicolai Christian Mustad (1878–1970), Norwegian businessman and art collector
Ole Hovelsen Mustad (1810–1884), Norwegian businessperson and politician
Sigbjørn Mustad (1897–1970), Norwegian lawyer and politician